Double Run is a  long 2nd order tributary to Spring Creek in Kent County, Delaware.

Variant names
According to the Geographic Names Information System, it has also been known historically as:  
Amsterdam Branch
Bucks Branch

Course
Double Run rises on the Heron Drain divide about 0.25 miles north of Breezewood, Delaware.  Double Run then flows east then southeast to meet Spring Creek about 1.5 miles north of Frederica, Delaware.

Watershed
Double Run drains  of area, receives about 44.8 in/year of precipitation, has a topographic wetness index of 575.19 and is about 9.7% forested.

See also
List of Delaware rivers

Maps

References

Rivers of Delaware
Rivers of Kent County, Delaware
Tributaries of the Murderkill River